Major League Baseball (MLB) annually honored its best relief pitcher with the Major League Baseball Delivery Man of the Year Award from 2005 through 2013. It was initially part of a sponsorship agreement between MLB and package delivery company DHL Express; DHL's sponsorship ran from 2005 to 2010. There was also a Delivery Man of the Month Award. From its inception in 2005 through 2008, the award was given to a single reliever who was selected online by fans from a group of 10 finalists chosen by an MLB panel. The panel took sole responsibility to select the annual winner starting in 2009.

Mariano Rivera was the only pitcher to win the annual award more than once, receiving it in 2005, 2006, and 2009. The award was discontinued after 2013, replaced by the Reliever of the Year Awards.

List of annual winners

See also

Sporting News Relief Pitcher of the Year Award) (2013–present; one in each league)
Sporting News Reliever of the Year Award (1960–2010; one in each league)
Rolaids Relief Man Award (1976–2012; one in each league)
Baseball awards
List of MLB awards

References

External links
 Delivery Man of the Year Award at MLB.com
 Delivery Man of the Year Award at Baseball Almanac

Delivery Man of the Year Award
Awards established in 2005
Awards disestablished in 2013
Delivery Man of the Year Award